Separate opinion is a term used by the European Court of Human Rights for both concurring opinion and dissenting opinion.

References 

European Union legal terminology
Judicial legal terminology